Sports Illustrated Women (previously called Sports Illustrated for Women) and also known as SI Women, was a bimonthly sports magazine covering (according to its statement of purpose) "the sports that women play and what they want to follow", from basketball to tennis, soccer to volleyball, field hockey to ice hockey and figure skating and more. It featured real athletes, told their real stories and gave the real scoop on women's sports. Sports Illustrated for Women was published by Time Inc."  It ran for 20 issues, between March 2000 and November 2002, targeting an audience of women, 18–34 years old, with "a passion for sports".

History
Sports Illustrated for Women, renamed Sports Illustrated Women (SI Women) in 2001, launched under the leadership of Cleary Simpson, Group Publisher and Sandy Bailey, Editor in Chief. SI Women initially ran test publications as Sports Illustrated Women/Sport, in 1997. The test magazine was published in two issues, followed by four special issues in 1999, under the title Sports Illustrated Women. The March 2000 launch of the ongoing product, slated for six issues per year, included a website, siforwomen.com. Circulation base rate was estimated at 300,000. By 2002 it had reached 400,000.  Its newsstand price was $3.50. Publishers Information Bureau statistics showed that SI Womens ad pages jumped 26.51 percent from 2000 to 2001 and its revenues increased  73.28 percent, from $5,499,509 to $9,529,281.

The magazine went through a makeover and name change (to SI Women) in September 2001, after Susan Casey, former Editor of Outside, took over from Sandy Bailey, as Editor in Chief. Research showed that, "women are more interested in sports as participants than fans, unlike men." That year, the magazine expanded, planning 10 issues per year and revamping its content to, "a wider range of activities pursued by today's modern, active women," including participatory sports with sections on training and adventure travel. In 2002, SI Women received a nomination for General Excellence from the National Magazine Awards.

Last issue
On 14 October 2002, SI Women announced that December 2002 would be its last issue. President Ann S. Moore cited the downturn in the ad economy, stating, "SI Women needed a significant investment to reach its potential", and, "The investment climate was simply not on our side."

Controversy

Sports Illustrated swimsuit edition was created with the intentions of celebrating women and exposing their beauty, however it has caused uproar within the media lately. In a study done by the Department of Sociology at the University of Louisville, it was found that out of the 716 regular Sports Illustrated magazines published between 2000 and 2011, only 35 of the covers featured female athletes. These surprising numbers have gotten increasingly worse considering between 1954 and 1965 women were given about 12.6% of cover images, according to the study.

According to Walter Bingham, SI writer and editor, many people want to do away with the swimsuit edition but it is their biggest money maker so they never could. About the evolution of the magazine, "the suits got skimpier and skimpier, the models' attributes bigger and bigger," Bingham wrote in 2010 in the Cape Cod Times.

References

Bimonthly magazines published in the United States
Defunct women's magazines published in the United States
Magazines established in 1999
Magazines disestablished in 2002
Women
Sports magazines published in the United States
Women's sports in the United States
1999 establishments in the United States